Robert Newman Cave (13 August 1888 – 30 September 1943) was an  Australian rules footballer who played with St Kilda in the Victorian Football League (VFL).

Notes

External links 

1888 births
1943 deaths
Australian rules footballers from South Australia
St Kilda Football Club players
Sturt Football Club players